The 1999–2000 season was Liverpool Football Club's 108th season in existence and their 38th consecutive season in the top-flight of English football. The club finished fourth in the Premier League, thus qualifying for the 2000–01 UEFA Cup.

Players

First-team squad
Squad at end of season

Left club during season

Reserve squad

Transfers

In
  Sami Hyypiä -  Willem II, 18 May, £2,600,000
  Titi Camara -  Marseille, 2 June, £2,600,000
  Stéphane Henchoz -  Blackburn Rovers, 3 June, £3,500,000
  Sander Westerveld -  Vitesse, 15 June,  £4,000,000
  Vladimír Šmicer -  Lens,1 July, £4,200,000
  Erik Meijer -  Bayer Leverkusen, 1 July, Free
  Dietmar Hamann -  Newcastle United, 22 July, £8,000,000
  Emile Heskey -  Leicester City, 10 March, £11,000,000

Out
  David James -  Aston Villa, 23 June, £1,800,000
  Steve McManaman -  Real Madrid, 1 July, free
  Jean-Michel Ferri  -  Sochaux, 14 July, £1,500,000
  Tony Warner -  Millwall, 17 July, free
  Jamie Cassidy -  Cambridge United, 22 July, free
  Sean Dundee -  Stuttgart, 30 July, £1,000,000
  Paul Ince -  Middlesbrough, 30 July, £1,000,000
  Øyvind Leonhardsen -  Tottenham Hotspur, 6 August, £3,000,000
  Bjørn Tore Kvarme -  Saint-Étienne, 30 August, £1,000,000
  Karl-Heinz Riedle -  Fulham, 28 September, £200,000
  Ian Dunbavin -  Shrewsbury Town, 22 January, free
  Eifion Jones -  Blackpool, 23 March, free
  Rob Jones -  West Ham United, free, 24 July

Events of the season
After a disappointing seventh-place finish the previous season, which left Liverpool without even UEFA Cup qualification, manager Gérard Houllier began to rebuild his squad and made seven close season signings. The attack was bolstered with the arrival of Titi Camara, Erik Meijer and Vladimír Šmicer. Succeeding Aston Villa-bound David James in goal was Dutchman Sander Westerveld. A new look central defence featured Stéphane Henchoz and Sami Hyypiä. Following the summer departure of former captain Paul Ince, Jamie Redknapp was made the new captain of the side, with Robbie Fowler appointed as vice-captain.

The season began on 7 August 1999 with a 2–1 win at Sheffield Wednesday, with Robbie Fowler and the debutant Titi Camara finding the net. However, the next game saw newly promoted Watford – in the top flight for the first time in over a decade – travel to Anfield and come away surprise 1–0 winners. Defeat followed in the next game as Liverpool travelled to Middlesbrough, but then came victories over Leeds United and Arsenal which saw the Reds occupy eighth place as the first month of the season drew to a close.

September saw the Reds navigate the second round of the Football League Cup with a comfortable aggregate win over financially troubled Division Three side Hull City, though they failed to achieve any victories in the league, losing 3–2 at home to Manchester United (with Jamie Carragher scoring two own goals), drawing 2–2 at Leicester City and finally losing 1–0 at home to Everton in the Merseyside derby. This left Liverpool 12th by the end of September, while their cross-city rivals were showing signs of a revival after three dismal seasons by occupying sixth place. Things improved slightly in October with two league victories over Chelsea and West Ham United. Southampton had ended Liverpool's League Cup hopes with a third round defeat earlier in the month, which ended with Liverpool's league standing slightly improved to ninth place. With a third of the season now gone, they were eight points off the top of a table being led by Leeds United.

November was a much better month for the Reds, who achieved wins over Bradford, Derby County and Sunderland to occupy fifth place by 20 November. They were now just six points behind leaders Manchester United. However, the month ended on a low note as they lost 1–0 at West Ham United.

Liverpool's revival continued in December as they beat struggling Sheffield Wednesday 4–1 at Anfield. With the FA Cup third round unusually being played before Christmas, they travelled to Division One promotion chasers Huddersfield Town on 12 December and came away 2-0 victors. A 2–0 win over Coventry City on 18 December meant that the Reds were still fifth in the league at Christmas, six points behind Manchester United.

Their FA Cup quest ended in a shock 1–0 fourth round defeat at home to Blackburn Rovers.

Liverpool's attack was bolstered with the club record £11 million signing of Leicester City's Emile Heskey on 10 March 2000.

The first two months of the new millennium saw mixed results for the Reds, but many of the teams around them dropped points as well, meaning that by mid February they were third in the league and just six points behind leaders Manchester United, who had a game in hand. There now appeared to be a realistic chance that the Reds might finally be able to end their ten-year wait for the league title. Three successive draws followed in March, then came a five-match winning run which lifted them to second place by 16 April. However, Manchester United now had an 11-point lead at the top of the table with just five games remaining, and needed just five points from those remaining games to be certain of retaining the league title. However, Liverpool still had something to play for, as the top three places in the Premier League now meant Champions League qualification. Competition for second and third place was still fierce, with Arsenal, Leeds United, Chelsea and Aston Villa all in close contention.

However, the season ended with a disastrous run of results. A goalless draw at Goodison Park in the Merseyside derby was followed by a 2–0 defeat at Chelsea. Emile Heskey's first game against old club Leicester on 3 May was a disaster as the East Midlanders came away from Anfield with a 2–0 victory. A goalless draw against Southampton followed, and on the final day of the season, 14 May, the Reds travelled to a Bradford City side battling it out with Wimbledon to avoid the last relegation place. An early David Wetherall goal gave Bradford a 1–0 win over the Reds, who surrendered a Champions League place and were forced to settle for a place in the UEFA Cup instead. The result also relegated Wimbledon, who, 12 years to the day, had beaten the Reds in one of the greatest FA Cup final shocks of all time.

Statistics

Appearances and goals

Players with no appearances not included in the list

|-
|colspan="14"|Players featured for club who have left:

|}
Source:

Top scorers

Disciplinary record

Source:

Results

Pre-season and friendlies

Premier League

Classification

Results summary

Results by round

FA Cup

League Cup

Notes

References

Liverpool F.C. seasons
Liverpool